The Airline Superintendents Association is a trade union in Trinidad and Tobago with most of its members in the former airline of BWIA.

See also

 List of trade unions

Transport trade unions in Trinidad and Tobago
Aviation trade unions